Lee Ki-taek (Korean: 이기택, 25 July 1937 – 20 February 2016) was a South Korean politician and parliamentarian.

Started as a youth politician of New Democratic Party in 1967, he served as the Chairman of Democratic Party, a splinter group of United Democratic Party known as "Little Democrats", from 1990 to 1991, and also as a co-president of newly formed Democratic Party along with Kim Dae-jung from 1991 to 1992, and solely from 1992 to 1995. He also served as the chairman for United Democratic Party from 1996 to 1997, and temporarily for Grand National Party in 1998. He was also a long-term Member of the National Assembly between the period of 1967 to 1996.

Early life 
Lee Ki-taek was born in Youngil County, North Gyeongsang Province (now in Pohang) on 25 July 1937. He had to move to Busan with his family in 1950 due to the Korean War. He was educated at Busan Commercial High School (now Kaesong High School), and earned a bachelor's degree in commerce, and also a master's degree in business administration from Korea University, where he used to be the President of Student Council and led a protest against election fraud of the President Syngman Rhee and his Freedom Party, which occurred the fall of the government. In 1961, he became the Division Chief in South Gyeongsang Province of Democratic Youth Committee.

Political career

Early years 
Prior to the 1967 election, Lee was brought to New Democratic Party (NDP) by its chairman, Yoo Jin-oh. He then ran 14th in the NDP list and elected as the youngest MP in South Korean history. He formed Pan-Youth Resistance Committee within the party, and led a protest against constitutional amendment proposed by Park Chung-hee, President of the Republic, and his ruling Democratic Republican Party. In 1971 election, he switched to Dongrae District 2nd constituency (also known as Busan 3rd constituency) and won. He was continuously elected to newly formed Dongrae District constituency in 1973 and 1978 election.

Lee was also a critic for Kim Young-sam, who was elected as the party's Chairman in 1974. He endorsed Lee Cheol-seung (CS) in 1976 leadership election, and CS could be elected as the new President of NDP, defeating Kim. Lee was then appointed as secretary-general by CS, but soon after, both were estranged from each other.

Lee ran for the chairmanship in 1979 leadership election. He received 17.8%, came to 3rd behind of Lee Cheol-seung and Kim Young-sam, and was eliminated from the 1st round. In the 2nd round, he endorsed Kim, who narrowly beat CS. Kim then appointed Lee as Deputy Chairman, which made him as the youngest person to hold the position in South Korea.

1980s 
Lee was banned from politics by New Military of Chun Doo-hwan in 1980, therefore unable to run in 1981 election. His constituency was then taken over by Park Kwan-yong, Lee's secretary, and Kim Jin-jae. He then moved to the United States and worked as a visiting professor in University of Pennsylvania.

After his political ban was lifted in 1984, Lee subsequently joined New Korea and Democratic Party (NKDP), along with Kim Young-sam and Kim Dae-jung. Originally, he was intended to run for Dongrae District, where he used to be an MP of, in 1985 election. However, the constituency was already taken over by Park Kwan-young, who was elected under the banner of Democratic Korea Party in 1981 and switched to NKDP in 1984. He then decided to run for Haeundae and South District constituency, and successfully returned as MP.

Lee served as Deputy Chairman under Lee Min-woo, who was elected for the chairmanship in 1985 leadership election. Soon, the party faced an internal conflicts, after Lee Min-woo announced his own plan (known as "Lee Min-woo Plan") that supported parliamentary system. This was strongly objected by Kim Young-sam (YS) and Kim Dae-jung (DJ), who advocated to maintain the incumbent presidential system but sought for direct election of the President. Both YS, DJ, and their followers left NKDP and founded United Democratic Party (UDP) on 21 April 1987. Lee was also one of them, but did not join UDP till the 29 June Declaration.

In 1988 election, Lee ran for Haeundae District and re-elected. He served as the Deputy Chairman of UDP from 1987 to 1989, and also the parliamentary leader, replacing Seo Seok-jae, in 1989. He was also the President of Special Investigative Committee established to investigate the corruptions regarding with the ruling Democratic Justice Party.

1990s 
On 22 January 1990, Kim Young-sam (YS), Chairman of UDP, declared to the party's merger with Democratic Justice Party and New Democratic Republican Party, in order to form Democratic Liberal Party (DLP). Lee, who led the party's dissidents, refused to join and formed Democratic Party, commonly known as "Little Democrats". He subsequently became the party's Chairman, but then decided to merge with Kim Dae-jung (DJ)'s New Democratic Unionist Party (NDUP) after the serious defeat in 1991 local elections.

On 16 September 1991, both NDUP and Little Democrats was combined altogether and re-founded as Democratic Party. Both DJ and Lee was elected as co-presidents. In 1992 election, he switched to proportional and won as 2nd.

Prior to the presidential election in 1992, Lee ran for the presidential primary on 26 May, but defeated with a large margin to DJ. Nevertheless, DJ was widely criticised for his controversial remarks, which called rural voters as "pro-DLP", and/or "pro-Roh Tae-woo". DJ lost to YS, and declared his retirement from politics. Lee solely became the party's president, and was re-elected in 1993.

The Democratic Party then absorbed New Korea Party of Lee Jong-chan in the early 1995, and won the local elections in 1995. However, shortly after, DJ officially returned to politics, and conflicts were sparked. The party's pro-DJ factions, not excluding DJ himself, left and founded a new party, named National Congress for New Politics (NCNP). Lee, who was in charge of this incident, had to resign his presidency. His party, was re-built as United Democratic Party (UDP) on 21 December.

Lee ran for Haeundae & Gijang 1st constituency in 1996 election, but lost to the ruling New Korea Party (NKP)'s Kim Woon-hwan, which ended his MP career for almost 30 years. Shortly after the defeat, he was elected as the Chairman of UDP. He kept trying to return as MP, and in 1997 by-elections, he ran for North District of Pohang, where he was born, but defeated to Park Tae-joon, who soon became a crucial figure of Alliance of DJP. He resigned his chairmanship on 11 September, and was replaced by Cho Soon, ex-Mayor of Seoul.

Under the leadership of Cho, UDP decided to merge with the ruling NKP, in order to overcome its minority position. Both were merged into Grand National Party (GNP), and most of members including Lee automatically joined to the new party, despite of some dissidents who refused to join i.e. Roh Moo-hyun. Cho then became the Chairman of newly formed GNP. Since GNP was de facto the ruling party, this was the first time that Lee became a ruling politician. Nevertheless, GNP's presidential candidate, Lee Hoi-chang, lost to NCNP's Kim Dae-jung, and Lee became again as an opposition politician.

After GNP lost to Alliance of DJP in 1998 local elections, Cho resigned his chairmanship. Lee was the acting chairman, till Lee Hoi-chang was newly elected.

2000s and after 
Prior to 2000 election, GNP faced a conflicts regarding with preselections. The party's dissidents, including Lee, left and established Democratic National Party (DNP). He was preselected as MP candidate for Yeonje District, but lost to GNP's Kwon Tae-mang.

During the presidential election in 2002, he supported Roh Moo-hyun, the presidential candidate of Millennium Democratic Party. Roh was then elected as the President of the Republic, but Lee subsequently declined his endorsement towards Roh due to the ideological conflicts. He did not run as MP from 2004 election.

In 2007 presidential election, Lee Ki-taek endorsed GNP's candidate Lee Myung-bak (MB). He then re-joined GNP, and was appointed to National Unification Advisory Council on 1 September 2008. After that, he was also involved in various organisations.

Death and legacy 
Lee passed away on 20 February 2016, in St. Mary's Hospital of Seoul, aged 78. The day before he died, he completed his reminiscences named The Way of a Cow (Korean: 우행). This was released on 15 September 2017.

Several politicians put comments regarding with him.

Personal life 
Lee Ki-taek married to Lee Kyung-ui, and had a son (Lee Sung-ho) and 3 daughters ― Lee Woo-in, Lee Ji-in, and Lee Se-in.

Lee's other family members were also key members of Taekwang Industry.

Election results

Notes

References 

1937 births
2016 deaths
Members of the National Assembly (South Korea)
20th-century South Korean politicians
Liberty Korea Party politicians
Korea University alumni
People from North Gyeongsang Province